The Gorakhpur–Panvel Express is an Express train belonging to North Eastern Railway zone that runs between  and  in India. It is currently being operated with 15065/15066 train numbers on a four days in a week basis.

Service

The 15065/Gorakhpur–Panvel Express has an average speed of 50 km/hr and covers 1746 km in 34h 50m. The 15066/Panvel–Gorakhpur Express has an average speed of 50 km/hr and covers 1746 km in 34h 50m.

Route and halts 

The important halts of the train are:

Coach composition

The train has LHB rakes with a max speed of 110 kmph. The train consists of 21 coaches:

 2 AC II Tier
 6 AC III Tier
 7 Sleeper coaches
 4 General Unreserved
 2 Generator Car

Traction

Both trains are hauled by a Gonda Loco Shed-based WDM-3A diesel locomotive from Gorakhpur to Gonda. From Gonda, train is hauled by a Valsad Loco Shed-based WAP-7 electric locomotive up till Panvel and vice versa.

Rake sharing 

The train shares its rake with 15063/15064 Gorakhpur–Lokmanya Tilak Terminus Express (via Barhni) and 15067/15068 Gorakhpur–Bandra Terminus Express (via Barhni)

See also 

 Gorakhpur Junction railway station
 Panvel Junction railway station
 Lokmanya Express
 Gorakhpur–Lokmanya Tilak Terminus Express (via Barhni)
 Gorakhpur–Bandra Terminus Express (via Barhni)

Notes

References

External links 

 15065/Gorakhpur–Panvel Express India Rail Info
 15066/Panvel–Gorakhpur Express India Rail Info

Passenger trains originating from Gorakhpur
Transport in Panvel
Express trains in India
Rail transport in Madhya Pradesh
Rail transport in Maharashtra
Railway services introduced in 2016